Pi Tau Sigma is an international honor society in the field of mechanical engineering, with most chapters established in the United States. It honors mechanical engineering students who have exemplified the "principles of scholarship, character and service..." in the mechanical engineering profession.

History 
Pi Tau Sigma came into being on March 16, 1915, at the University of Illinois. A similar organization was formed November 15, 1915, at the University of Wisconsin. The two schools then met to join their societies, doing so in Chicago on March 12, 1916. To date, 167 chapters have been inducted into the organization throughout the United States, with 157 still active.

Membership 
Both undergraduate and graduate students are eligible to join Pi Tau Sigma based on academic achievement. Juniors in the top 25% of their class and seniors in the top 35% of their class, based on grades, are invited to join.  Membership fees are due at initiation, and membership lasts a lifetime.

Pi Tau Sigma members are chosen on a basis of sound engineering ability, scholarship, personality, and probable future success in their chosen field of mechanical engineering. There are three grades of membership: Honorary, Graduate, and Active. Honorary members are technical graduates actively engaged in engineering work, or members of mechanical engineering faculties. Graduate membership is conferred upon persons who would have been eligible had Pi Tau Sigma been established earlier in schools not having chapters, or upon those continuing graduate study. Active members are selected from the junior and senior mechanical engineering classes at their respective schools whose mechanical engineering curriculum must be accredited by the A.B.E.T.

Insignia 
The colors of the society are murrey and azure. The flower is the white rose.

References 

Association of College Honor Societies
Honor societies
Engineering honor societies
Student organizations established in 1915
1915 establishments in Illinois